Mikkayla Sheridan (born 20 January 1995) is an Australian swimmer. She won gold in the women's  freestyle event at the 2018 Pan Pacific Swimming Championships. In the Autumn of 2019, she was member of the inaugural International Swimming League swimming for the New York Breakers, who competed in the Americas Division.

References

External links
 

1995 births
Living people
Australian female freestyle swimmers
Swimmers at the 2018 Commonwealth Games
Place of birth missing (living people)
Commonwealth Games competitors for Australia